Peter James Dolfen (May 21, 1880 – May 31, 1947) was an American sport shooter who competed in the 1912 Summer Olympics. In addition to his two medals, he also competed in the 30 m rapid fire pistol event and finished 16th.
 
Dolfen was born in Hartford, Connecticut, and died in East Longmeadow, Massachusetts.

References

External links
 Peter Dolfen's profile at databaseOlympics

1880 births
1947 deaths
American male sport shooters
ISSF pistol shooters
Shooters at the 1912 Summer Olympics
Olympic gold medalists for the United States in shooting
Olympic silver medalists for the United States in shooting
Medalists at the 1912 Summer Olympics
19th-century American people
20th-century American people